Diving medicine, also called undersea and hyperbaric medicine (UHB), is the diagnosis, treatment and prevention of conditions caused by humans entering the undersea environment. It includes the effects on the body of pressure on gases, the diagnosis and treatment of conditions caused by marine hazards and how relationships of a diver's fitness to dive affect a diver's safety. Diving medical practitioners are also expected to be competent in the examination of divers and potential divers to determine fitness to dive.

Hyperbaric medicine is a corollary field associated with diving, since recompression in a hyperbaric chamber is used as a treatment for two of the most significant diving-related illnesses, decompression sickness and arterial gas embolism.

Diving medicine deals with medical research on issues of diving, the prevention of diving disorders, treatment of diving accidents and diving fitness. The field includes the effect of breathing gases and their contaminants under high pressure on the human body and the relationship between the state of physical and psychological health of the diver and safety.

In diving accidents it is common for multiple disorders to occur together and interact with each other, both causatively and as complications.

Diving medicine is a branch of occupational medicine and sports medicine, and at first aid level, an important part of diver education.

Range and scope of diving medicine 

The scope of diving medicine must necessarily include conditions that are specifically connected with the activity of diving, and not found in other contexts, but this categorization excludes almost everything, leaving only deep water blackout, isobaric counterdiffusion and high pressure nervous syndrome. A more useful grouping is conditions that are associated with exposure to variations of ambient pressure. These conditions are largely shared by aviation and space medicine. Further conditions associated with diving and other aquatic and outdoor activities are commonly included in books which are aimed at the diver, rather than the specialist medical practitioner, as they are useful background to diver first aid training.

The scope of knowledge necessary for a practitioner of diving medicine includes the medical conditions associated with diving and their treatment, physics and physiology relating to the underwater and pressurised environment, the standard operating procedures and equipment used by divers which can influence the development and management of these conditions, and the specialised equipment used for treatment.

Scope of knowledge for diving medicine 
The ECHM-EDTC Educational and Training Standards for Diving and Hyperbaric Medicine (2011) specify the following scope of knowledge for Diving Medicine:

 Physiology and pathology of diving and hyperbaric exposure.
 Human physiology of underwater diving
 Hyperbaric physics
 Diving related physiology
 Hyperbaric pathophysiology of immersion
 Pathophysiology of decompression
 A brief introduction to acute dysbaric disorders
 Chronic dysbaric disorders
 Hyperbaric oxygen therapy basis – Physiology and pathology
 Oxygen toxicity
 Pressure and inert gas effects
 Nitrogen narcosis
 High pressure neurological syndrome
 Medication under pressure
 Non-dysbaric diving pathologies
 Diving technology and safety
 Basic safety planning
 Compressed air work
 Diving procedures
 Wet bells and stages
 Scuba diving on air and mixed gas
 Surface supplied diving
 Standard diving (copper helmet)
 Rebreather diving (semi-closed and closed circuit)
 Other diving procedures
 Characteristics of various divers
 Diving equipment as used to c.50m and Chambers
 Diving tables and computers
 Regulations and standards for diving
 Saturation diving
 Saturation mode
 Physiology of deep exposure
 Compression
 At depth in a living chamber
 Bell excursions
 Fitness to dive
 Fitness to dive criteria and contraindications for divers, compressed air workers and HBOT chamber personnel
 Fitness to dive assessment
 Fitness to dive standards (professional and recreational)
 Diving accidents
 Diving incidents and accidents
 Emergency medical support with no chamber on site
 Barotrauma: ENT; dental; cutaneous, conjunctival, etc.
 Physical injuries
 Decompression illness
 Pathophysiological basis and mechanisms of DCI
 Differential diagnosis of decompression illness
 Management of decompression incidents at the surface
 Immediate management, recompression tables and strategies
 Rehabilitation of disabled divers
 Diving accident investigation
 Clinical HBO
 Recompression chambers

Scope of knowledge for hyperbaric medicine 
The ECHM-EDTC Educational and Training Standards for Diving and Hyperbaric Medicine (2011) specify the following scope of knowledge for Hyperbaric Medicine additional to that for Diving medicine:
 Physiology and pathology of diving and hyperbaric exposure.
 HBO-Basics – effects of hyperbaric oxygen – physiology and pathology
 Clinical HBO
 Chamber technique (multiplace, monoplace, transport chambers, wet recompression)
 Mandatory indications
 HBO Recommended indications
 HBO Experimental and anecdotal indications
 HBO Data collection / statistics / evaluation
 HBO General basic treatment (nursing)
 HBO Diagnostic, monitoring and therapeutic devices in chambers
 Risk assessment, incidents monitoring and safety plan in HBO chambers
 HBO Safety regulations

Diagnostics 

The signs and symptoms of diving disorders may present during a dive, on surfacing, or up to several hours after a dive. Divers have to breathe a gas which is at the same pressure as their surroundings, which can be much greater than on the surface.

The principal conditions are: decompression illness (which covers decompression sickness and arterial gas embolism); nitrogen narcosis; high pressure nervous syndrome; oxygen toxicity; and pulmonary barotrauma (burst lung). Although some of these may occur in other settings, they are of particular concern during diving activities.

The disorders are caused by breathing gas at the high pressures encountered at depth, and divers will often breathe a gas mixture different from air to mitigate these effects. Nitrox, which contains more oxygen and less nitrogen is commonly used as a breathing gas to reduce the risk of decompression sickness at recreational depths (up to about ). Helium may be added to reduce the amount of nitrogen and oxygen in the gas mixture when diving deeper, to reduce the effects of narcosis and to avoid the risk of oxygen toxicity. More exotic mixtures such as hydreliox, a hydrogen–helium–oxygen mixture, are used at extreme depths to counteract this.

Decompression sickness 

Decompression sickness (DCS) occurs when gas, which has been breathed under high pressure and dissolved into the body tissues, forms bubbles as the pressure is reduced on ascent from a dive. The results may range from pain in the joints where the bubbles form to blockage of an artery leading to damage to the nervous system, paralysis or death. While bubbles can form anywhere in the body, DCS is most frequently observed in the shoulders, elbows, knees, and ankles. Joint pain occurs in about 90% of DCS cases reported to the U.S. Navy, with neurological symptoms and skin manifestations each present in 10% to 15% of cases. Pulmonary DCS is very rare in divers.

Pulmonary barotrauma and arterial gas embolism 
If the breathing gas in a diver's lungs cannot freely escape during an ascent, the lungs may be expanded beyond their compliance, and the lung tissues may rupture, causing pulmonary barotrauma (PBT). The gas may then enter the arterial circulation producing arterial gas embolism (AGE), with effects similar to severe decompression sickness. Gas bubbles within the arterial circulation can block the supply of blood to any part of the body, including the brain, and can therefore manifest a vast variety of symptoms.

Nitrogen narcosis 

Nitrogen narcosis is caused by the pressure of dissolved gas in the body and produces temporary impairment to the nervous system. This results in alteration to thought processes and a decrease in the diver's ability to make judgements or calculations. It can also decrease motor skills, and worsen performance in tasks requiring manual dexterity. As depth increases, so does the pressure and hence the severity of the narcosis. The effects may vary widely from individual to individual, and from day to day for the same diver. Because of the perception-altering effects of narcosis, a diver may not be aware of the symptoms, but studies have shown that impairment occurs nevertheless. The narcotic effects dissipate without lasting effect as the pressure decreases during ascent.

High-pressure nervous syndrome 

This became known as high-pressure nervous syndrome, and its effects are found to result from both the absolute depth and the speed of descent. Although the effects vary from person to person, they are stable and reproducible for the individual.

Oxygen toxicity 

Although oxygen is essential to life, in concentrations significantly greater than normal it becomes toxic, overcoming the body's natural defences (antioxidants), and causing cell death in any part of the body. The lungs and brain are particularly affected by high partial pressures of oxygen, such as are encountered in diving. Susceptibility to oxygen toxicity varies dramatically from person to person, and to a smaller extent from day to day for the same diver. Prior to convulsion, several symptoms may be present – most distinctly that of an aura.

Treatments 
Treatment of diving disorders depends on the specific disorder or combination of disorders, but two treatments are commonly associated with first aid and definitive treatment where diving is involved. These are first aid oxygen administration at high concentration, which is seldom contraindicated, and generally recommended as a default option in diving accidents where there is any significant probability of hypoxia, and hyperbaric oxygen therapy, which is the definitive treatment for most conditions of decompression illness.

Oxygen therapy 

The administration of oxygen as a medical intervention is common in diving medicine, both for first aid and for longer term treatment.
Normobaric oxygen administration at the highest available concentration is frequently used as first aid for any diving injury that may involve inert gas bubble formation in the tissues. There is epidemiological support for its use from a statistical study of cases recorded in a long term database.

Recompression and hyperbaric oxygen therapy 

Recompression treatment in a hyperbaric chamber was initially used as a life-saving tool to treat decompression sickness in caisson workers and divers who stayed too long at depth and developed decompression sickness. In the 21st century, it is a highly specialized treatment modality found to be effective for treating many conditions where the administration of oxygen under pressure is beneficial.

Hyperbaric oxygen treatment is generally preferred when effective, as it is usually a more efficient and lower risk method of reducing symptoms of decompression illness, but in some cases recompression to pressures where oxygen toxicity is unacceptable may be required to eliminate the bubbles in the tissues in severe cases of decompression illness.

Medical examination for fitness to dive

Fitness to dive, (or medical fitness to dive), is the medical and physical suitability of a person to function safely in the underwater environment using underwater diving equipment and procedures. Depending on the circumstances it may be established by a signed statement by the diver that he or she does not suffer from any of the listed disqualifying conditions and is able to manage the ordinary physical requirements of diving, to a detailed medical examination by a physician registered as a medical examiner of divers following a procedural checklist, and a legal document of fitness to dive issued by the medical examiner.

The most important medical examination is the one before starting diving, as the diver can be screened to prevent exposure when a dangerous condition exists. The other important medicals are after some significant illness, where medical intervention is needed there and has to be done by a doctor who is competent in diving medicine, and can not be done by prescriptive rules.

Psychological factors can affect fitness to dive, particularly where they affect response to emergencies, or risk taking behaviour. The use of medical and recreational drugs, can also influence fitness to dive, both for physiological and behavioural reasons. In some cases prescription drug use may have a net positive effect, when effectively treating an underlying condition, but frequently the side effects of effective medication may have undesirable influences on the fitness of diver, and most cases of recreational drug use result in an impaired fitness to dive, and a significantly increased risk of sub-optimal response to emergencies.

Education and registration of practitioners 
Specialist training in underwater and hyperbaric medicine is available from several institutions, and registration is possible both with professional associations and governmental registries.

Education

Registration 
The American Medical Association recognises the sub-speciality Undersea and Hyperbaric Medicine held by someone who is already Board Certified in some other speciality.

The South African Department of Employment and Labour registers two levels of Diving Medical Practitioner. Level 1 is qualified to conduct annual examinations and certification of medical fitness to dive, on commercial divers (equivalent to ECHM-EDTC Level 1. Medical Examiner of Divers), and Level 2 is qualified to provide medical advice to a diving contractor and hyperbaric treatment for diving injuries (equivalent to ECHM-EDTC Level 2D Diving Medicine Physician)

Australia has a four tier system: In 2007 there was no recognised equivalence with the European standard.
 GPs completing the first tier four- to five-day course on how to examine divers for ‘fitness to dive’ can then add their names to the SPUMS Diving Doctors List
 GPs completing the second tier two-week diving medicine courses provided by the Royal Australian Navy and the Royal Adelaide Hospital, or the two-week course in Diving and Hyperbaric Medicine provided by the ANZ Hyperbaric Medicine Group, qualify to do commercial-diving medicals.
 The third tier is the SPUMS Diploma in Diving and Hyperbaric Medicine. The candidate must attend a two-week course, write a dissertation related to DHM and have the equivalent of six months’ full-time experience working in a hyperbaric medicine unit.
 The fourth tier is the Certificate in Diving and Hyperbaric Medicine from the ANZ College of Anaesthetists.

Training of divers and support staff in relevant first aid

Divers 
A basic knowledge understanding of the causes, symptoms and first aid treatment of diving related disorders is part of the basic training for most recreational and professional divers, both to help the diver avoid the disorders, and to allow appropriate action in case of an incident resulting in injury.

Recreational divers 
A recreational diver has the same duty of care to other divers as any ordinary member of the public, and therefore there is no obligation to train recreational divers in first aid or other medical skills. Nevertheless, first aid training is recommended by most, if not all, recreational diver training agencies.

Recreational diving instructors and divemasters, on the other hand, are to a greater or lesser extent responsible for the safety of divers under their guidance, and therefore are generally required to be trained and certified to some level of rescue and first aid competence, as defined in the relevant training standards of the certifying body. In many cases this includes certification in cardiopulmonary resuscitation and first aid oxygen administration for diving accidents.

Professional divers 
Professional divers usually operate as members of a team with a duty of care for other members of the team. Divers are expected to act as standby divers for other members of the team and the duties of a standby diver include rescue attempts if the working diver gets into difficulties. Consequently, professional divers are generally required to be trained in rescue procedures appropriate to the modes of diving they are certified in, and to administer first aid in emergencies. The specific training, competence and registration for these skills varies, and may be specified by state or national legislation or by industry codes of practice.

Diving supervisors have a similar duty of care, and as they are responsible for operational planning and safety, generally are also expected to manage emergency procedures, including the first aid that may be required. The level of first aid training, competence and certification will generally take this into account.
 In South Africa, registered commercial and scientific divers must hold current certification in first aid at the national Level 1, with additional training in oxygen administration for diving accidents, and registered diving supervisors must hold Level 2 first aid certification.
 Offshore diving contractors frequently follow the IMCA recommendations.

Diver medic 
A diver medic or diving medical technician is a member of a dive team who is trained in advanced first aid.

A diver medic recognised by IMCA must be capable of administering first aid and emergency treatment, and carrying out the directions of a physician, and be familiar with diving procedures and compression chamber operation. The diver medic must also be able to assist the diving supervisor with decompression procedures, and provide treatment in a hyperbaric chamber in an emergency. The diver medic must hold, at a minimum, a valid certificate of medical fitness to operate in a pressurized environment, and a certificate of medical fitness to dive.

Training standards for diver medic are described in the IMCA Scheme for Recognition of Diver Medic Training.

Ethical and medicolegal issues 
Experimental work on human subjects is often ethically and/or legally impracticable. Tests where the endpoint is symptomatic decompression sickness are difficult to authorise and this makes the accumulation of adequate and statistically valid data difficult. The precautionary principle may be applied in the absence of information allowing a realistic assessment of risk. Analysis of investigations into accidents is useful when reliable results are available, which is less often than would be desirable, but privacy concerns prevent a large mount of information potentially useful to the general diving population from being made available to researchers.

History of diving medical research

Timeline 
 November 1992: The first examination for certification in Undersea Medicine by the American Board of Preventive Medicine.
 November 1999: The first examination for Undersea and Hyperbaric Medicine qualification.

Notable researchers 
 
 Arthur J. Bachrach
 Albert R. Behnke
 Peter B. Bennett
 Thomas E. Berghage
 Paul Bert
 George F. Bond
 Alf O. Brubakk
 Albert A. Bühlmann
 Carl Edmonds
 William Paul Fife
 John Scott Haldane
 Robert William Hamilton Jr.
 Leonard Erskine Hill
 Brian Andrew Hills
 F.J. Keays
 Christian J. Lambertsen
 Joseph B. MacInnis
 Simon Mitchell
 Richard E. Moon
 František Novomeský
 John Rawlins
 Charles Wesley Shilling
 Edward D. Thalmann
 Richard D. Vann
 James Vorosmarti
 R.M. Wong
 Robert D. Workman

Research organisations

See also

References

Further reading

External links

Scubadoc's Diving Medicine Online
Diving Diseases Research Centre (DDRC)
 Diving Medical Literature
SCUBA Diving and Asthma
infos scuba diving restrictions
 – free download of complete text

 
Military medicine